The Château du Houssoy is a 14th and 15th century castle in the commune of Crouy-sur-Ourcq in the Seine-et-Marne département of France.

It has been listed since twice as a monument historique by the French Ministry of Culture. One wing furnished with machicolations, extending along the Avenue de la Gare, was listed in 1932. The keep and the gabled wall of the former house, including its chimneys, were added in 1962.

See also
List of castles in France

External links

References

Castles in Île-de-France
Buildings and structures in Seine-et-Marne
Monuments historiques of Île-de-France